Salman Sabah Al-Salem Al-Homoud Al-Sabah (born 17 September 1960) is the Minister of Information and Minister of State for Youth Affairs in Kuwait.

Career 
 2012; reappointed 2013: Minister of Information and State Minister for Youth Affairs.

References 

1960 births
Living people
Government ministers of Kuwait
Kuwait University alumni
House of Al-Sabah